FK Teteks is a football club from the city of Tetovo in North Macedonia. They are currently competing in the Macedonian Second League.

History 
In 1946, there was a club from Tetovo called Šar Tetovo, and it competed in the Macedonian Republic League and Macedonian Cup. It won the Macedonian Cup two times in 1948 and 1950, and was successful in the Macedonian League. However, it was dissolved after a few years, mostly because of financial difficulties. Not much long after this, a new club was founded on the base of FK Šar, named Tekstilec.

The club was founded in 1953, under the name FK Tekstilec. The founder of FK Teteks is the textile combine Teteks and because of this they are known as "Štofari" (Tailors). They were in the shadow of the older club FK Ljuboten (formed in 1919). FK Ljuboten's squad was full with homegrown players from Tetovo, while Teteks had the capability to attract the best players from Macedonia and wider from the former Federation. They won the Macedonian Republic League on four occasions and along with Vardar, was the only other Macedonian club to have won the Federal EasternFederal Second League containing teams from 3 federal Republics: Macedonia, Montenegro and Serbia.

Teteks played in the inaugural Macedonian First League, but finished 17th and were relegated. The club was bought by a German concern UFA Media Group with Braco Vujchik as chairman. After winning the Macedonian Second League in 2009, they were promoted back to the top level of Macedonian football, for the 2009/2010 season. Teteks claimed their first Macedonian Football Cup in 2010 and in the summer made their European debut in the UEFA Europa League. In 2013, Teteks made history by becoming the first relegated team in Macedonia to win the national Cup.

Derby of Tetovo – Tetovo's big derby match used to take place between FK Teteks, whose fans are working class, and FK Ljuboten, whose fans are the oldest citizens of Tetovo. But today's main rival of FK Teteks is Shkëndija, whose fans are predominantly Albanians from Tetovo.

At the end of July 2020, teteks management took over the second-division club FK Labunishta in 2011, and moved the club to Tetovo. According to the move, the club is scheduled to be named Labunishta 2011, in the first half of the season and Tetek 1953, in the second half of the season.

Teteks Arena
The City Park Stadium is the home ground of FK Teteks. Its built by Teteks Confection Company the owners of FK Teteks Football club. Its last expansion is done in 1980. The Arena has a capacity of 12 000 seats with one fully covered stand .

Honours 

  Champions (4):
 1st: 1965, 1969, 1974, 1985
 2nd League
 Federal Second league:
 1st: 1981

 Macedonian Second League:
 1st: 2009

  Cup Winners (6):
 1st: 1948,1950,1978, 1982, 2010, 2013
 2nd:2011, 2015

 Macedonian Supercup:
 2nd:  2013

Recent seasons 

1The 2019–20 season was abandoned due to the COVID-19 pandemic in North Macedonia.

Teteks in Europe

Current squad 
As of 23 February 2023.

Historical list of coaches

 Toni Jakimovski (2008 – Jun 2011)
 Dragi Setinov (29 Jul 2011 – 24 Sep 2012)
 Gjorgji Todorovski (25 Sep 2012 – 19 Mar 2013)
 Gorazd Mihajlov (19 Mar 2013 - 31 Jul 2013)
 Zoran Smileski (Jul 2013 – May 2014)
 Zoran Boshkovski (interim) (7 May 2014 - Jun 2014)
 Dobrinko Ilievski (1 Jul 2014 - 4 Sep 2014)
 Gjorgji Todorovski (Sep 2014 - Mar 2015)
 Gorazd Mihajlov (19 Mar 2015 – 30 Jun 2015)
 Ivica Jovanoski (2016–17)
 Miroslav Jakovljević (2018–)
 Gjorgji Todorovski (2019 -)

Supporters 
The supporters of FK Teteks are named Vojvodi (Dukes) since 28 October 1988. They are also known as Vojvodi Jug (South Dukes) because their home side tribune is on the south side. The Vojvodi's well-known motto is "Со Верба Во Бог – Војводи До Гроб" (With trust in God, Dukes until the grave).
They have a great relations with FK Vardar fans, Komiti Skopje.

References

External links 
Official Website 
Club info at MacedonianFootball 

 
Teteks
Association football clubs established in 1953
1953 establishments in the Socialist Republic of Macedonia